Baghaur is a village located in Khanna tehsil, in the Ludhiana district of Punjab, India. The total population of the village is about 865.

"work profile"

In Baghaur village out of total population, 401 were engaged in work activities. 96.01 % of workers describe their work as Main Work (Employment or Earning more than 6 Months) while 3.99 % were involved in Marginal activity providing livelihood for less than 6 months. Of 401 workers engaged in Main Work, 69 were cultivators (owner or co-owner) while 148 were agriculture helpers

References

  
Villages in Ludhiana district